Princess Alexandra of Hanover may refer to:

 Princess Alexandra of Hanover (1882–1963), daughter of Ernest Augustus, Crown Prince of Hanover, wife of Frederick Francis IV, Grand Duke of Mecklenburg-Schwerin
 Alexandra Prinzessin von Hannover (1937–2015), wife of Prince Welf Ernst of Hanover
 Princess Alexandra of Hanover (born 1999), daughter of Ernest Augustus V, Prince of Hanover and Caroline, Princess of Hanover and Princess of Monaco